Brendan Mikkelson (born June 22, 1987) is a retired Canadian professional ice hockey defenceman who last played for Welsh team Cardiff Devils in the UK Elite Ice Hockey League (EIHL). He was a second round selection of the Mighty Ducks of Anaheim, 31st overall, at the 2005 NHL Entry Draft. He was a member of the 2007 Memorial Cup-winning Vancouver Giants team, and was named a tournament all-star on defence.

Playing career
Mikkelson was born in Regina, Saskatchewan, and raised in St. Albert, Alberta, where he played Bantam hockey for the St. Albert Raiders of the Alberta Bantam Hockey League in 2001–02. He was a sixth-round pick in the 2002 WHL Bantam Draft. Mikkelson played his first two seasons in the WHL with the Portland Winter Hawks. Midway through his third season with the club (the 2005–06 season), he was traded to the Vancouver Giants. Mikkelson contributed 29 points in 69 games in the 2006–07 season, a season in which the Giants hosted and won the 2007 Memorial Cup.

Mikkelson was drafted by the Mighty Ducks of Anaheim in the second round, 31st overall, in the 2005 NHL Entry Draft. On November 30, 2006, he was signed to a three-year, entry level contract with the Ducks. On October 19, 2010, Mikkelson was claimed by the Calgary Flames on waivers. 
On July 14, 2011, he signed a one-year contract extension with the Flames. The Flames traded Mikkelson to the Tampa Bay Lightning on January 6, 2012, in exchange for forward Blair Jones. He scored his first NHL goal on March 17, 2012, against Jaroslav Halák of the St. Louis Blues in a 3–1 Lightning defeat.

On July 19, 2013, Mikkelson left the Lightning organization as a free agent and signed a one-year, two-way contract with the Pittsburgh Penguins. He was assigned to Pittsburgh's American Hockey League (AHL) affiliate, the Wilkes-Barre/Scranton Penguins, for the duration of the 2013–14 season and registered a professional best 30 assists and 38 points in 73 games.

On September 28, 2014, the AHL's Toronto Marlies announced they had signed Mikkelson to a one-year contract.

On May 8, 2015, Luleå HF of the Swedish Hockey League announced they had Mikkelson to a two-year contract. After three seasons with Luleå HF, Mikkelson left as a free agent to continue his European career in Germany, having agreed to a one-year contract for the 2018–19 season with Adler Mannheim of the Deutsche Eishockey Liga (DEL) on July 2, 2018.

After a successful lone season in the DEL helping Adler claim the Championship, Mikkelson signed a one-year contract in the neighbouring Austrian Hockey League (EBEL) with EC Red Bull Salzburg on June 18, 2019.

With the COVID-19 pandemic halting the season with Salzburg, Mikkelson left at the conclusion of his contract returning to Sweden after signing a two-year contract as a free agent with Modo Hockey of the Allsvenskan on April 24, 2020.

On May 21, 2021 it was announced that Mikkelson will be playing for the Cardiff Devils of the Elite Ice Hockey League (EIHL) in the 2021–22 season.

Personal
Mikkelson's father Bill played in the NHL for the Los Angeles Kings, New York Islanders and Washington Capitals in the 1970s, while his sister, Meaghan, plays on the Canadian national women's team and won a gold medal at the 2010 and 2014 Winter Olympics. His brother-in-law, Scott Reid, is a career minor league goaltender. His great uncle, Jim McFadden, won the Calder Memorial Trophy in 1948 and the Stanley Cup in 1950.

Career statistics

Regular season and playoffs

International

Awards and honors

References

External links

1987 births
Living people
Abbotsford Heat players
Adler Mannheim players
Anaheim Ducks draft picks
Anaheim Ducks players
Calgary Flames players
Canadian ice hockey defencemen
Canadian people of Danish descent
Canadian expatriate ice hockey players in Sweden
Cardiff Devils players
Ice hockey people from Alberta
Ice hockey people from Saskatchewan
Iowa Stars players
Luleå HF players
Modo Hockey players
Portland Pirates players
Portland Winterhawks players
EC Red Bull Salzburg players
Sportspeople from Regina, Saskatchewan
Sportspeople from St. Albert, Alberta
Syracuse Crunch players
Tampa Bay Lightning players
Toronto Marlies players
Vancouver Giants players
VIK Västerås HK players
Wilkes-Barre/Scranton Penguins players